The Stöde Church is a church building in Stöde, Sweden. Belonging to the Stöde Parish of the Church of Sweden, construction begun in 1757 and was completed in 1759.

References

External links

18th-century Church of Sweden church buildings
Churches in Västernorrland County
Churches completed in 1759
Churches in the Diocese of Härnösand